Timycen Maruma (born 19 April 1988) is a Zimbabwean international cricketer. Beginning his cricketing career as a leg-spinner, he shifted his role to an all-rounder. In 2008, he scored his maiden first-class half-century (71) against a strong Pakistani representative team.

Maruma had his best first-class season to date in 2007 when he teamed up with fellow spinner Prosper Utseya to help Easterns province lift the Logan Cup.

He made his One Day International (ODI) debut against South Africa in 2007. He went on to make his Test debut as an opening batsman for Zimbabwe against Bangladesh in 2013. In September 2018, he was named in Zimbabwe's squad for the 2018 Africa T20 Cup tournament. He was the leading run-scorer in the 2018–19 Logan Cup, with 409 runs in six matches. In September 2019, he was named in Zimbabwe's Twenty20 International (T20I) squad for the 2019–20 Bangladesh Tri-Nation Series.

In December 2020, he was selected to play for the Mountaineers in the 2020–21 Logan Cup.

References

External links
 

1988 births
Living people
Manicaland cricketers
Zimbabwean cricketers
Zimbabwe Test cricketers
Zimbabwe One Day International cricketers
Zimbabwe Twenty20 International cricketers